Microlechia melongenae is a moth in the family Gelechiidae. It was described by Povolný and Bradley in 1980. It is found in southern India.

The length of the forewings is 3.8-3.9 mm. The forewings are ochreous-white, sprinkled with scattered cinereous, blackish grey and ochreous tipped scales. The hindwings are dark grey.

The larvae feed on Solanum melongena. They mine the leaves of their host plant.

References

Microlechia
Moths described in 1980